"A Letter to Elise" is a song by English rock band the Cure, released as the third and final single from the album Wish on 5 October 1992. In 2010, Pitchfork Media ranked it at number 184 in their list of "The Top 200 Tracks of the 1990s".

Background 

"A Letter to Elise" was made public for the first time on MTV's Cure-"Unplugged" show in 1991 and had very different lyrics from the later version to be released as a 7". Letters to Felice by Kafka was a huge influence when Robert Smith wrote the lyrics of the track.

The B-side "The Big Hand" was planned as an A-side single early in 1993 but the idea was scrapped, largely due to Boris Williams not wanting the track to appear on the album but having no qualms about it appearing as a B-side (from KROQ radio interview with the band in 1992). "The Big Hand" is one of the few B-sides to be played live, although very rarely. It was first played in 1991, performed a few times during the Wish Tour in 1992, then revived at the Ultra Music Festival in 2007, and was occasionally played during the band's 4Tour World Tour 2007–08.

A promo version of the song features yet another longer unreleased mix, with phaser on Robert Smith's voice. An instrumental version on cassette is also known to exist.

"A Letter to Elise" itself was revived by the band's new Smith/Gallup/Thompson/Cooper lineup in 2005 after being played sparingly, if ever, during the Smith/Gallup/Bamonte/Cooper/O'Donnell era.

Impact 

"A Letter to Elise" has been covered by Aaron Sprinkle, for his Really Something EP; Blink-182, for the MTV Icon show for the Cure; and Sense Field, for their 2003 album Living Outside.

Track listings

Personnel
 Robert Smith – guitar, keyboard, vocals, 6 string bass
 Perry Bamonte – 6 string bass, guitar, keyboard
 Simon Gallup – bass
 Porl Thompson – guitar
 Boris Williams – percussion, drums
 Bryan 'Chuck' New

Charts

References

External links
 

Songs about letters (message)
Rock ballads
The Cure songs
1990s ballads
1992 singles
Songs written by Robert Smith (musician)
1992 songs
Fiction Records singles
Songs containing the I–V-vi-IV progression
Songs written by Perry Bamonte
Songs written by Boris Williams
Songs written by Lol Tolhurst
Songs written by Porl Thompson
Song recordings produced by David M. Allen